Dancer is a 2005 Indian Tamil-language dance film written and directed by Keyaar. The film was produced by Yogesh KR under KR Infotainment Pvt. Ltd. The film which revolves around a handicapped dancer with one leg was released on 12 January 2005.

Cast
J. Kutty as Kutty
Robert as Arun
Kaniha as Divya
Chinni Jayanth
Kaka Radhakrishnan
Manivannan
Delhi Ganesh
Vasu Vikram
T. P. Gajendran
Meera Krishnan
Swaminathan
Master Udayaraj as Kutty's friend

Production
Keyaar was inspired to direct the film with Kutty, a one legged handicapped dancer after seeing him dancing at a concert at Kamarajar auditorium. Kutty did not appear in further films aside from By the People (2005) and Lee (2007) as he died by falling down stairs in 2007.

Soundtrack
Soundtrack was composed by Pravin Mani and lyrics were written by Pa. Vijay and Na. Muthukumar.
"Dancer" — Karthik, Suresh Peters
"Jingulu Jingale" — Rafi, Suchitra
"Kothavaranga" — Mathangi, Gopal
"Iraiva" — S. P. Balasubrahmanyam
"Sonnathu" — Srinivas

Reception
IndiaGlitz wrote "Though Keyar has taken up a message in the movie, he seems to have made the movie interesting by adding commercial elements at right mix". Malathi Rangarajan of The Hindu wrote, "Despite a logical story line, a docu-feel does crop up now and then [...] The ideal is lofty. But the insensitivity in execution (for the most part) is disconcerting". Malini Mannath wrote for Chennai Online, "Though Dancer is predictable story-telling, it's a film you would not regret watching".

References

Bibliography

External links 

2000s dance films
2000s Tamil-language films
2005 films
Films about disability in India
Films directed by Keyaar
Indian dance films